Sara E Harris (born 1969) is a Canadian scientist, and professor in the department of Earth, Ocean, and Atmospheric Sciences, and the associate dean academic in the Faculty of Science at the University of British Columbia. In 2015, she was named a 3M National Teaching Fellow for her MOOC on climate change.

Education 
Sara Harris obtained her PhD in geological oceanography from the College of Oceanic and Atmospheric Sciences, Oregon State University in 1998.

Career 
From 1998 to 2005, she served as the chief scientist at the Sea Education Association in Woods Hole, Massachusetts. In this role, she would take students out to sea for six weeks to teach methodologies for collecting oceanographic data as well as navigation and sailing. She was a senior instructor at the University of British Columbia prior to becoming professor of teaching there. In that role, she studies evidence-based science education and how people learn climate science. In 2013, she co-taught a massive open online course called Climate Literacy: Navigating Climate Change Conversations, and later taught Climate Change: The Science on the edX platform.

Teaching 
Harris has taught a number of courses at the University of British Columbia, including Introduction to Environmental Science, Research Project in Environmental Science, The Fluid Earth: Atmosphere and Ocean, and Global Climate Change.

Bibliography 
Burch, Sarah; Harris, Sara (2014-07-03). Understanding Climate Change: Science, Policy, and Practice University of Toronto Press, Scholarly Publishing Division. .

References 

Oregon State University alumni
Living people
Place of birth missing (living people)
Women oceanographers
Academic staff of the University of British Columbia
Canadian women scientists
Canadian oceanographers
1969 births